Miguel Checa District is one of eight districts of the province Sullana in Peru. It was created by law on 10 November 1950 by the government of President Manuel A. Odría.

Of interest in Miguel Checa District are the archaeological site and huaca "La Mariposa", and the colonial mansion "Casa de Sojo". The district was named after Miguel Checa who built the "Casa de Sojo" in 1910.

Notes and references

Districts of the Sullana Province